Jimmy or James Jewell may refer to:

James A. Jewell (c.1840–1912), American public official on Board of General Appraisers
James Jewell (politician) (1869–1949), Australian Labor Party member of Victorian Legislative Assembly
Jimmy Jewell (association football) (1898–1952), English football manager and referee
Jimmy Jewell (saxophonist) (born 1945).
James Jewell (director) (1906–1975), American radio director, producer and actor in Detroit
Jimmy Jewell (climber) (1953–1987), British solo rock climber who fell during descent

See also
James Francis Jewell Archibald (1871–1934), American war correspondent in Spanish–American War and World War I
Jimmy Jewel (1909–1995), English comedian and actor in stage, radio, television and film
Jewell James Ebers (1921–1959), American electrical engineer (Ebers-Moll model)